Leigh Wood may refer to:

 Leigh Wood (footballer), British footballer
 Leigh Wood (boxer) (born 1988), British boxer